Yunis Abdelhamid (born 28 September 1987) is a professional footballer who plays as a defender for Ligue 1 club Reims, which he captains. Born in France, he played for the Morocco national team from 2016 to 2020, making eleven appearances.

Club career
Out of contract from Valenciennes, Abdelhamid joined Dijon on a three-year contract on 15 May 2016.

Abdulhamid helped Reims win the 2017–18 Ligue 2 and promote to the Ligue 1 for the 2018–19 season.

International career
Abdulhamid was called up to the Morocco national team for a friendly against Albania on 1 September 2016, but did not feature. He made his official debut in a 2–0 2017 Africa Cup of Nations qualification win over São Tomé and Príncipe.

Honours
Reims
 Ligue 2: 2017–18

References

External links
Yunis Abdelhamid profile at foot-national.com

1987 births
Living people
Citizens of Morocco through descent
French sportspeople of Moroccan descent
Moroccan footballers
Footballers from Montpellier
French footballers
Association football defenders
Morocco international footballers
Ligue 1 players
Ligue 2 players
Championnat National 3 players
AC Arlésien players
Valenciennes FC players
Dijon FCO players
Stade de Reims players
2019 Africa Cup of Nations players